The BYD e2 is an electric vehicle compact hatchback with the BYD e3 as the compact sedan version developed by BYD Auto with an all-electric range of up to .

Overview

The BYD e2 was unveiled during the 2019 Shanghai Auto Show in April 2019. The standard BYD e2 is equipped with a BYD-1814-TZ-XS-A permanent magnet motor with the maximum output of 94 hp (70 kW) while the BYD e2 400 is equipped with a permanent magnet motor with the maximum output of 134 hp (100 kW), with the maximum torque of both motors being 180 N-m. 

Being the sedan version of the e2, the BYD e3 has the same performance numbers. The e2 and e3 both come with two battery options, a 35.2 kWh model with a range of up to 305 km (190 miles) NEDC and a 47.3 kWh model with a range of up to 405 km (252 miles) NEDC. AC normal charging takes 1.5 hours with the 35.2 kWh battery pack and 1.6 hours with the 47.3 kWh battery pack while DC fast charging from 30 to 80% can be done in 30 minutes. Acceleration from 0 to 50 km/h (31 mph) takes 3.9 seconds.

Prices of the BYD e2 at launch range from 89,800 yuan to 144,800 yuan. Prices of the BYD e3 at launch range from 103,800 yuan to 164,800 yuan.

References

External links

BYD e2 Official Site
BYD e3 Official Site
BYD E2 L.Riker™ - car autohome

e2
Production electric cars
Cars introduced in 2019
Front-wheel-drive vehicles
Compact cars
Crossover sport utility vehicles
2010s cars